Peter Holland (born January 14, 1991) is a Canadian former professional ice hockey centreman who most recently played for Djurgårdens IF of the Swedish Hockey League (SHL).  Nicknamed Pistol Pete, Holland was selected by the Anaheim Ducks in the first round, 15th overall, of the 2009 NHL Entry Draft, and made his NHL debut for the Ducks during the 2011–12 season.

Playing career

Amateur
Holland grew up in Bolton, Ontario. As a youth, he played and won the 2004 Quebec International Pee-Wee Hockey Tournament with the Brampton Junior Battalion minor ice hockey team under Andy Bathgate and his son Bill Bathgate. After a successful minor midget season, where Holland had 119 points (59 goals and 60 assists in 60 games), he was selected in the first round, 11th overall, by the Ontario Hockey League (OHL)'s Guelph Storm in the 2007 OHL Priority Draft.  His 2008–09 season caught the attention of scouts, as he earned a spot in the OHL All-Star Game, played in the Canada-Russia Challenge and participated in the 2009 CHL Top Prospects Game. He also represented Team Canada at the 2009 IIHF World U18 Championships. Heading into the 2009 NHL Entry Draft, Holland was ranked 19th by the NHL Central Scouting Bureau. The Anaheim Ducks selected Holland in the first round, 15th overall.

Professional
On November 5, 2011, Holland made his NHL debut. After scoring 11 points in 12 games to start the 2011–12 season with the Syracuse Crunch, the Anaheim Ducks' American Hockey League (AHL) affiliate, Anaheim recalled Holland to play in a 5–0 road game loss against the Detroit Red Wings. He scored his first NHL goal (the game's winner) on November 11, 2011, against Roberto Luongo of the Vancouver Canucks.

On November 16, 2013, Holland was traded by the Ducks (along with Brad Staubitz) to the Toronto Maple Leafs in exchange for Jesse Blacker and two picks in the 2014 NHL Entry Draft. He scored his first goal as a Maple Leaf on November 21, 2013, against Marek Mazanec of the Nashville Predators. Holland wore number 24 for the Toronto Maple Leafs.

On July 16, 2014, Holland agreed to a two-year contract extension with Toronto worth an annual average value of $775,000.

After the 2015–16 season, he re-signed with Toronto on a one-year, $1.3 million contract. As the season began Holland was overshadowed by a plethora of young forward rookies including Auston Matthews, Mitch Marner and Connor Brown, among others. Due to limited roster space, Holland seldom played for the Maple Leafs, being scratched in 17 of the team's first 25 games, and seeing limited ice time in the eight games he did play. After being informed by general manager Lou Lamoriello that the team would do their best to trade him, Holland was traded to the Arizona Coyotes in exchange for a conditional draft pick in 2018 on December 9, 2016; the condition was not satisfied.

On July 1, 2017, as a free agent, Holland signed a two-year contract with the Montreal Canadiens, playing the second year on a one-way basis. Ahead of the 2017–18 season, Holland was unable to make the Canadiens' roster out of training camp and was assigned to Montreal's AHL affiliate, the Laval Rocket. With 18 points in 20 games with Laval, on November 30, 2017, Holland was traded to the New York Rangers in exchange for Adam Cracknell.

To start the 2018–19 season, Holland played with New York's AHL affiliate, the Hartford Wolf Pack. On February 18, 2019, Holland was traded to the Chicago Blackhawks in exchange for Darren Raddysh. Assigned to the Rockford IceHogs, Holland continued his scoring pace in notching 7 goals and 16 points in 21 games to conclude the season.

As an impending free agent from the Blackhawks, Holland opted to pursue a career abroad in agreeing to a two-year contract from Russian club, Avtomobilist Yekaterinburg of the KHL on May 22, 2019.

In 2021, Holland graduated Summa Cum Laude from Southern New Hampshire University with a B.S in Business Administration. 

Holland signed on a one-year contract with Swedish club Djurgårdens IF of the top tier Swedish Hockey League in September 2021.

Holland played 15 games with Djurgårdens IF and made a total of six assists. In october Djurgården played a game against Luleå HF and Holland got into a fight. He ripped an opponents helmet off, took his own gloves off and repeatedly punched the Luleå player in the face using his fists. Holland was suspended for four games and given a fine of 40 000 SEK/4000USD by The Swedish Ice Hockey Association's disciplinary board. Hollands excuse was that he had never before played in a league where fighting resulted in anything other than a 5 minute penalty. He also claimed he never intended to harm an opponent. The Luleå player, Fredrik Styrman, got a concussion. 10 months after the attack he had to end his hockey career because of remaining symptoms of the concussion. 

On March 16, 2022, Holland announced through Twitter that he has retired from professional hockey.

Career statistics

Regular season and playoffs

International

References

External links
 

1991 births
Living people
Anaheim Ducks draft picks
Anaheim Ducks players
Arizona Coyotes players
Avtomobilist Yekaterinburg players
Canadian ice hockey centres
Djurgårdens IF Hockey players
Guelph Storm players
Hartford Wolf Pack players
Ice hockey people from Ontario
Laval Rocket players
National Hockey League first-round draft picks
New York Rangers players
Norfolk Admirals players
People from Caledon, Ontario
Rockford IceHogs (AHL) players
Syracuse Crunch players
Toronto Maple Leafs players
Toronto Marlies players